Mixtepec may refer to:

Geography
Magdalena Mixtepec
San Bernardo Mixtepec
San Gabriel Mixtepec
San Juan Mixtepec (disambiguation)
San Juan Mixtepec, Miahuatlán
San Juan Mixtepec, Mixteca
San Miguel Mixtepec
San Pedro Mixtepec (disambiguation)
San Pedro Mixtepec, Juquila
San Pedro Mixtepec, Miahuatlán
Santa Cruz Mixtepec

Languages
Mixtepec Mixtec
Asunción Mixtepec Zapotec
Mixtepec Zapotec
San Agustín Mixtepec Zapotec
San Miguel Mixtepec Zapotec language